The North Wales Weekly News is one of a group of newspapers published weekly in Llandudno.

History
The newspaper was first published on 14 February 1889 by local printer Robert Evans Jones as the Weekly News and Visitors’ Chronicle for Colwyn Bay, Colwyn, Llandrillo, Conway, Deganway and Neighbourhood, a four-page broadsheet which cost 1d. Jones' brother William built a new printworks in 1900 on Conwy Quay, where the Weekly News continued to be published until May 1972 when it moved to new purpose-built premises in Llandudno Junction; shortly afterwards it abandoned hot metal typesetting in favour of computerised printing; later technological developments allowed copy to be transmitted to the printworks from branch offices elsewhere in North Wales.
In 1988, the Jones family sold the newspaper to Trinity International plc, with Robert Evans Jones' great-nephew remaining chairman of the new board, and in 2014 the paper celebrated its 125th anniversary.

Sister titles
Related titles cover most of coastal North Wales. Much of the material published is shared between a number of other titles but with the addition of some local material relevant to each specific title. Sister English language titles include:
Abergele Visitor
Bangor and Anglesey Mail
Caernarfon Herald
Denbighshire Visitor
Flintshire Chronicle
Holyhead and Anglesey Mail
Rhyl Visitor
Wrexham Chronicle

There is also one primarily Welsh language paper, Yr Herald.

The papers are owned and managed by Reach plc (formally Trinity Mirror), who also published the Liverpool Daily Post - a Welsh variant of the Daily Post - until that ceased publication in December 2013.

References

External links 
North Wales Weekly News

Newspapers published in Wales
Llandudno
Newspapers published by Reach plc
1889 establishments in Wales
Newspapers established in 1889